John Kennel Jr. Farm is a registered historic building near Trenton, Ohio, listed in the National Register on 1984-08-03.

Historic uses 
Single Dwelling

Original portion of farmhouse was built in 1876.  An additional kitchen with second level bedroom added in the 1930s.  All of red brick construction with stone foundation.  Basement floor is brick, a portion of the basement was used to slaughter and cure meat.  What is now the garage was originally a summer kitchen.

At one time grapes and pears were grown in the back yard.  A pecan tree, reputed to be the only one in the state of Ohio that bears nuts once existed.

The property is quite close to Native American burial grounds and approximately 2.5 miles to the north is a signal mound, believed to be built by the Adena.  Many artifacts (arrowheads and hammering devices) have been found on the John Kennel Jr. property over the decades.

See also
 John Kennel Sr. Farm

Notes

External links
Ohio Historic Inventory

Houses on the National Register of Historic Places in Ohio
Houses in Butler County, Ohio
National Register of Historic Places in Butler County, Ohio